Jennie Öberg (born November 4, 1989) is a Swedish former cross-country skier.

In January 2015, she won her first and only World Cup race, a freestyle sprint in Rybinsk. Öberg announced her retirement on 13 May 2020.

Cross-country skiing results
All results are sourced from the International Ski Federation (FIS).

World Championships

World Cup

Season standings

Individual podiums
 1 victory – (1 ) 
 1 podium – (1 )

References

External links 

1989 births
Living people
Swedish female cross-country skiers
Tour de Ski skiers
Piteå Elit skiers
21st-century Swedish women